The 2020 Launceston International was a professional tennis tournament played on hard courts. It was the sixth (men) and ninth (women) editions of the tournament which was part of the 2020 ATP Challenger Tour and the 2020 ITF Women's World Tennis Tour. It took place in Launceston, Tasmania, Australia between 3 and 9 February 2020.

Men's singles main-draw entrants

Seeds

 1 Rankings are as of 20 January 2020.

Other entrants
The following players received wildcards into the singles main draw:
  Alexander Crnokrak
  Blake Ellis
  Matthew Romios
  Tristan Schoolkate
  Dane Sweeny

The following player received entry into the singles main draw using a protected ranking:
  Jeremy Beale

The following players received entry from the qualifying draw:
  Steven Diez
  Naoki Tajima

The following players received entry as lucky losers:
  Calum Puttergill
  Ryota Tanuma

Women's singles main-draw entrants

Seeds

 1 Rankings are as of 20 January 2020.

Other entrants
The following players received wildcards into the singles main draw:
  Laura Ashley
  Amber Marshall

The following players received entry from the qualifying draw:
  Zara Brankovic
  Park So-hyun
  Lisa Pigato
  Himari Sato
  Olivia Symons
  Tian Fangran

Champions

Men's singles

 Mohamed Safwat def.  Alex Bolt 7–6(7–5), 6–1.

Women's singles
 Asia Muhammad def.  Destanee Aiava, 6–4, 6–3

Men's doubles

 Evan King /  Benjamin Lock def.  Kimmer Coppejans /  Sergio Martos Gornés 3–6, 6–3, [10–8].

Women's doubles
 Alison Bai /  Jaimee Fourlis def.  Alicia Smith /  Abigail Tere-Apisah, 7–6(7–4), 6–3

References

External links
 Official website
 2020 Launceston International at ITFtennis.com

2020 ATP Challenger Tour
2020 ITF Women's World Tennis Tour
2020 in Australian tennis
Launceston Tennis International
February 2020 sports events in Australia